The 2009 World Junior Table Tennis Championships were held in Cartagena, Colombia, from 9 to 16 December 2009. It was organised by the  Federación Colombiana de Tenis de Mesa under the auspices and authority of the International Table Tennis Federation (ITTF).

Medal summary

Events

Medal table

See also

2009 World Table Tennis Championships

References

World Junior Table Tennis Championships
World Junior Table Tennis Championships
World Junior Table Tennis Championships
World Junior Table Tennis Championships
Table tennis in Colombia
International sports competitions hosted by Colombia
World Junior Table Tennis Championships